Eugenio Gerardo Lobo Huerta (24 September 1679, Cuerva, Toledo – 1750, Barcelona) was a Spanish soldier and poet.  He was the Military Governor of Barcelona from 1746 until his death.

References

1679 births
1750 deaths
Spanish poets
Spanish generals
Spanish male poets